Scarecrow Slayer is a 2003 American direct-to-video slasher film produced by The Asylum. It is a sequel to the 2002 film Scarecrow. The film was a direct-to-video release, as well as its predecessor, and its 2004 sequel Scarecrow Gone Wild.

The film was directed by David Michael Latt, who also wrote the screenplay for the film. The film stars Tony Todd, Nicole Kingston, and David Castro.

Plot
Caleb Kilgore (Tony Todd) is a farmer who has been obsessed with a scarecrow that killed his father (Michael Flowers Jr) years ago. Two friends looking to join a fraternity are given the initiation task of stealing the scarecrow from Caleb's field. After his father's murder, Caleb had caught the scarecrow and tied it down so that it could never escape.

When Caleb sees the friends, including a guy named Dave (Brett Erickson), moving the scarecrow, Caleb shoots the scarecrow, not knowing that Dave is beneath the scarecrow. Dave dies, and his soul is transferred into that of the scarecrow...and then the scarecrow kills Caleb.

Dave, in the form of the scarecrow, decides that he wants his old girlfriend Mary back. But Mary is dating a college student, so the scarecrow kills the student. Mary decides to get help from some friends who are in an ROTC unit in a military academy.

The ROTC guys have access to an arsenal of weapons, but that doesn't stop the scarecrow, and he kills them all. The scarecrow is willing to kill anyone who gets in the way of turning Mary into a scarecrow too so that they can be together forever.

Finally, a friend of Dave's from the academy named Karl (David Castro) inadvertently becomes a scarecrow, and fights the Dave scarecrow. The Dave scarecrow wins the fight, but then Mary blows him to pieces with a rocket-launcher and walks away smiling, relieved that the nightmare is finally over.

Cast
 Tony Todd as Caleb Kilgore 
 David Dillon as Young Caleb
 Todd Rex as The Scarecrow
 Michael Flowers Jr as Orson Kilgore  
 Brett Erickson as Dave 
 David Castro as Karl 
 Nicole Kingston as Mary Anderson 
 Elizabeth Perry as Judy 
 Robin Dale Meyers as Interviewer Kim
 Tami Sheffield as Nurse Mandy 
 D.C. Douglas as Dr. Baxter
 Scott Carson as Sheriff Deputy Larry Lane 
 Kim Little as Sheriff Deputy Rachel Lane
 Shannon Young as Ruby 
 Jessica Mattson as Sheila 
 Steven Schultz as Gavin 
 Brendan Aucoin as Rick 
 Jonathan Murphy as Jobin 
 Mark Irvingsen as Bob 
 Steven Glinn as Bartlett 
 Scott Parietti as White

Distribution
Scarecrow Slayer was coupled with the first film as Scarecrow/Scarecrow Slayer on 28 December 2004.

Reception
One review states: "Director David Michael Latt shoots a movie that at least resembles what you would expect a professional low budget horror movie to look like". Another reviewer commented: "Overall, this film is nothing like the previous film and offers no real entertainment".

References

External links
 

2003 horror films
2003 films
Fictional scarecrows
Films directed by David Michael Latt
American sequel films
American slasher films
The Asylum films
2000s English-language films
2000s American films